"One More Lie (Standing in the Shadows)" is a song by British singer Craig David. It was written by David, Jerry Abbott, Grant Black, and Shridhar Solanki for his fifth studio album Signed Sealed Delivered (2010), while production was helmed by Abbott and Black. The chorus samples from "Standing in the Shadows of Love" (1966) by American vocal quartet The Four Tops. Due to the inclusion of the sample, Brian Holland, Lamont Dozier, and Eddie Holland are also credited as songwriters.
"One More Lie (Standing in the Shadows)" was released in the UK on 22 March 2010 as a digital download, serving as the album's lead single.

Chart performance
"One More Lie (Standing in the Shadows)" debuted on the UK Singles Chart at number 76 in the week beginning 28 March 2010. It became David's lowest-charting single since "Officially Yours", which charted outside the top 100.

Music video
A video for "One More Lie (Standing in the Shadows)" was directed by Dale Resteghini. It debuted on 21 January 2010 on YouTube and is mainly a club scene-based clip. It was also nominated for Best Video at the 2010 Urban Music Awards.

Track listing

Charts

References

2010 singles
Craig David songs
Songs written by Holland–Dozier–Holland
Songs written by Craig David
Music videos directed by Dale Resteghini
2010 songs